Maféré is a town in south-eastern Ivory Coast. It is a sub-prefecture and commune of Aboisso Department in Sud-Comoé Region, Comoé District.
In 2014, the population of the sub-prefecture of Maféré was 34,760.

Villages
The nine villages of the sub-prefecture of Maféré and their population in 2014 are:
 Ehania V5  (1 868)
 Ehania V6  (1 577)
 Ehania V8  (1 037)
 Kokotilé-Anvo  (680)
 Maféré  (13 120)
 Mouyassué  (1 998)
 Baffia  (3 059)
 Diby  (6 570)
 Koffikro-Afféma  (4 851)

References

Sub-prefectures of Sud-Comoé
Communes of Sud-Comoé